Eucalyptus alba, commonly known as white gum, khaki gum or poplar gum, is a species of tree that is native to Australia, Timor, and New Guinea. It has smooth bark, lance-shaped to egg-shaped leaves, flower buds in groups of seven, white flowers and conical to hemispherical fruits.

Description
The trunk is often bent and has smooth pinkish red to white or cream-coloured, powdery bark. White flowers appear from August to November and are sometimes profuse.

The related Eucalyptus bigalerita is similar in appearance, but has larger leaves, buds and seed pods, and is found in alluvial flats.

Taxonomy
Eucalyptus alba was first described in 1826 by Carl Ludwig Blume, after being discovered by Caspar Georg Carl Reinwardt on Timor and the description was published in Blume's book, Bijdragen tot de flora van Nederlandsch Indië .  The specific epithet (alba) is a Latin word meaning "white" and refers to the bark. Within the genus Eucalyptus, this species belongs in the subgenus Symphyomyrtus. Common names include white gum, poplar gum, khaki gum, wongoola, salmon gum and Timor white gum.

Distribution and habitat
A dominant tree in open woodlands, white gum is found from northeastern Western Australia in the Kimberley region across the Top End of the Northern Territory and between the Cape York Peninsula and Rockhampton in Queensland, as well as New Guinea and Timor. It is often found on ridges and elevated areas, often on poor soil.

Uses
Eucalyptus alba has horticultural appeal as a small ornamental tree, and can also attract birds. It has also been used for fencing in northern Australia, while the flowers have been used in the beekeeping industry for honey. It was valued by aborigines in the Northern Territory for firewood.

See also

List of Eucalyptus species

References

Flora of Queensland
Trees of Australia
alba
Myrtales of Australia
Flora of East Timor
Plants described in 1826
Flora of the Northern Territory
Eucalypts of Western Australia
Taxa named by Carl Ludwig Blume